Thomas Garnier  (1776–1873), "the elder", was an English churchman and botanist.

Thomas Garnier may also refer to:

Thomas Garnier (Dean of Lincoln) (1809–1863), "the younger", Dean of Lincoln, England
Thomas Garnier (cricketer) (1841–1898), English cleric and cricketer

See also
Thomas Garner (1839–1906), architect